"So Fly" is a song performed by American Hip Hop supergroup 213, which consisted of Snoop Dogg, Warren G and Nate Dogg. It was released on July 6, 2004 as the first single off their studio album The Hard Way, with the record label TVT Records. The song was produced by Spike & Jamahl and  Missy Elliott. It uses the same backing track as another Elliott-produced song, "So Gone," which had been released by Monica the previous year.

Track listing 
CD Single
So Fly  — 4:07

Charts

References

2004 debut singles
Snoop Dogg songs
Warren G songs
Nate Dogg songs
Song recordings produced by DJ Pooh
TVT Records singles
2004 songs
Songs written by Warren G
Songs written by Snoop Dogg